Genetically engineered blood is blood that has been modified for therapeutic or other purposes.

Technology 

Genetically modifying red blood stem cells allows them to produce specific therapeutic proteins on the surface or inside the cell. The stem cells are taken from mammalian bone marrow and are modified in culture. Before they become mature, mammalian red blood cells eject their genetic material. Culturing cells that produce a new protein of interest requires only a few weeks. Using the sortagging protein labeling technique, the researchers used the bacterial enzyme sortase A to establish a strong chemical bond between the surface protein and a substance of choice, such as a small-molecule therapeutic agent or an antibody. The modifications leave the cells and their surfaces otherwise intact.

Applications 

One application is to engineer red blood cells into drug-delivery vehicles. Mature red cells carry no genetic material, potentially presenting fewer safety risks than other gene and cell therapies. Human red blood cells circulate for as long as four months, meaning they could potentially form the basis of long-term therapies. The cells move throughout body via the bloodstream and are unnoticed by the immune system.

References 

Genetic engineering
Blood